Babanka is an urban-type settlement in Uman Raion of Cherkasy Oblast (province) of Ukraine. It hosts the administration of Babanka settlement hromada, one of the hromadas of Ukraine. Population:

References

Notes

Sources
 
 
 

Urban-type settlements in Uman Raion
Umansky Uyezd